Robert Dale Timm (October 2, 1921 – January 6, 2016) was an American politician and businessman.

Born in Harrington, Washington, Timm served in the United States Marine Corps during World War II. He received his bachelor's degree in economics from University of Washington and worked in the aeronautics industry. Timm served on the Harrington School Board. He then served in the Washington House of Representatives from 1951 to 1957 and was a Republican. From 1965 to 1970, Timm served as chairman of the Washington State Utilities and Transportation Board. From 1961 to 1976, Timm served on the Civil Aeronautics Board, in Washington, D. C. and was chairman of the board.

Notes

1921 births
2016 deaths
People from Lincoln County, Washington
Military personnel from Washington (state)
University of Washington College of Arts and Sciences alumni
Businesspeople from Washington (state)
School board members in Washington (state)
Republican Party members of the Washington House of Representatives
20th-century American businesspeople
United States Marine Corps personnel of World War II